Nevadopalpa is a genus of moth in the family Gelechiidae.

Species
 Nevadopalpa alboaura Povolný, 1999
 Nevadopalpa albula Povolný, 1998
 Nevadopalpa deaurata Povolný, 1999
 Nevadopalpa maculata Povolný, 1999
 Nevadopalpa minor Povolný, 1998
 Nevadopalpa nevadana Povolný, 1999
 Nevadopalpa striata Povolný, 1998

References

 , 1998: Nevadopalpa albula spec. nov., a third species of the genus Nevadopalpa Povolný, 1998 from California (Insecta: Lepidoptera: Gelechiidae). Reichenbachia 32: 313-315.
 , 1999: A revision of the genus Nevadopalpa Povolný, 1998 with description of four new species. Shilap Revista de Lepidopterologia 27 (107): 379-391.

 
Gnorimoschemini